Sheykh Ahmad or Sheykhahmad may refer to:

Places
 Sheykh Ahmad, Ardabil
 Sheykh Ahmad, East Azerbaijan
 Sheykh Ahmad, Meyaneh, East Azerbaijan Province
 Sheykh Ahmad, Khuzestan
 Sheykh Ahmad, Shush, Khuzestan Province
 Sheykh Ahmad, West Azerbaijan

People
 Dhondia Wagh, who was given the name "Shaikh Ahmad" after his conversion to Islam